John Nelson was one of the earliest known Englishmen to convert to Islam. This information comes from the book The Voyage made to Tripoli (1583) by Thomas Saunders.

See also
List of converts to Islam

References

External links
 Muslims in Britain
 The historical roots of British Islam

Converts to Islam
English Muslims
16th-century English people